Purdie House and Purdie Methodist Church is a historic home and Methodist church located near Tar Heel, Bladen County, North Carolina.  The house was built about 1803–1806, and is a two-story, four bay by two bay, brick Federal style dwelling. It has a steep gable roof and two-story gallery porches.  Purdie Methodist Church is a mid-19th century temple-form Greek Revival style frame building.

It was added to the National Register of Historic Places in 1977.

References

Methodist churches in North Carolina
Houses on the National Register of Historic Places in North Carolina
Churches on the National Register of Historic Places in North Carolina
Federal architecture in North Carolina
Greek Revival church buildings in North Carolina
Houses completed in 1806
Churches completed in 1845
Churches in Bladen County, North Carolina
National Register of Historic Places in Bladen County, North Carolina
Houses in Bladen County, North Carolina